Phir Wahi Raat is a 1980 Indian Hindi-language horror film starring Rajesh Khanna as a psychologist doctor opposite Kim, then girlfriend of Danny. The film music and scores composed by R. D. Burman. This is the first and the only film directed by Danny Denzongpa. The film grossed 2 crores and was a commercial hit.

Plot
Asha (Kim) lives in a hostel and troubled by the nightmares of her deceased aunt. The hostel warden (Lalita Pawar) and her friend Shobha (Aruna Irani) take her to a psychiatrist Dr Vijay (Rajesh Khanna). Doctor finds nothing wrong with her and advises her to get away from old memories. Parents of other girl's from the hostel complains the administration about Asha's behaviour and she was told to vacate the place.

Asha decides to go to her ancestral home. Dr Vijay and Shobha accompanies her. The huge manor is taken care of by Vishwanath (A.K. Hangal) and his daughter Gauri (Tamanna). Dr Vijay and Asha develop a bond and after a few days Dr Vijay goes back to city for some work. Same night Asha sees a scary looking woman walking in the corridors. The woman keeps haunting her every night and Asha's condition worsens. Dr Vijay comes back to help her and meets Asha's cousin Ashok (Danny) in the manor.

Dr Vijay and Ashok plan a big party on the occasion of Asha's birthday. Ashok calls his wife who lives abroad to join them. Ashok's wife arrives, when Asha is cutting her birthday cake. Asha gets shocked to see her as she is the same woman who is haunting her from last many days in the house. She gets panicked and stabs Ashok's wife, who succumbs to her injuries and dies on the spot. Police inspector Sharma (Suresh Oberoi), who is a guest of the party arrests Asha on the charge of murder. The court suspends the hearing as Asha's condition is not stable and she is not suitable to go through the legal process.

Dr Vijay treats Asha and tries to get the answer why Asha killed Ashok's wife. He tells Asha that Ashok's wife arrives in India on the same day and there is no possibility that Asha saw her before her birthday in that house. But Asha is adamant that it was Ashok's wife who was haunting her.

Gauri also gets killed after a few days. Shobha starts watching another woman walking around the house. Dr Vijay investigates further with the help of Inspector Sharma and solve the mystery at the end exposing a web of lies and greed.

Cast
Rajesh Khanna as Dr. Vijay
Kim as Asha
Danny Denzongpa as Ashok Verma
Aruna Irani as Shobha
Shubha Khote as Shobha's Sister
Jagdeep as Krupachand Reswani
A. K. Hangal as Vishwanath
Tamanna as Gauri
Lalita Pawar as Hostel Warden
Shashikala as Aunty
Suresh Oberoi as Inspector Sharma
Bhagwan Dada as Gendamal
Mukri as Drunken Man
Mohan Choti as Man at Bar
Birbal as Man at Bar
Om Shivpuri as Dr. Desai

Crew
Direction; Danny Denzongpa
Production; N. N. Sippy
Camera; Sudarshan Nag, S.N. Dubey
Music Direction; Rahul Dev Burman
Lyrics; Majrooh Sultanpuri
Playback; Asha Bhosle, Kishore Kumar, Lata Mangeshkar, Mohammad Rafi, Sushma Shrestha

Soundtrack

References

External links 
 

1980 films
1980s Hindi-language films
Indian ghost films
1980 horror films
Indian horror films
Films scored by R. D. Burman
Films set in country houses
1980 directorial debut films
Hindi-language horror films